Abbie Richards (born 1996) is a feminist and environmental activist whose conspiracy theory charts went viral on Twitter in 2020 and 2021. She is based in Melbourne, Australia and is of Jewish descent.

Early life and education 
Richards was born in 1996 and grew up in Newton, Massachusetts. She graduated from Colorado College with a degree in environmental science and as of August 2020 was studying for a masters in climate studies at Wageningen University & Research in the Netherlands.

Comedy career 
After graduating from Colorado College, Richards moved to Melbourne to work in standup comedy.

Social media career 
She began posting criticism of golf and golf courses on TikTok after running past a golf course in the spring of 2020 and noticing the course's "no trespassing" signs. She told The Daily Dot that "the privatization of green spaces, especially during a pandemic when people need to maximize their distance from one another, made me furious." She posted to TikTok a video "about running for president to make golf illegal" which went viral. Her posts focus on concerns about environmental impact and social inequality, but she also includes among her criticisms that the game is boring and "the clothes are ugly". According to Richards her posts "started as a joke, and 100 percent is not a joke anymore" as her concerns became more serious as she did more research.

ESPN commenter Kenny Mayne referenced the anti-golf content in a tweet, saying "The producers think the TikTok Golf hater girl @abbieasr is too avant-garde for a full SportsCenter segment".

On May 30, 2020, she posted a video showing a protester at a racial justice march during the George Floyd protests talking to an emotional police officer, which received 6 million views. By July 2020, views of her TikTok posts had dropped to under 9000 each in what Screen Rant called an apparent case of shadow banning, either intentional or due to a faulty algorithm. She also was restricted from live streaming on TikTok without explanation.

In January 2021, Richards published an op-ed about golf on Euronews Living entitled "Golf is a giant board game damaging the planet: Time for it to go."

In 2020, Richards created "The Conspiracy Chart", an inverted pyramid assessing various conspiracy theories on a spectrum from "Grounded in Reality" to "Detached from Reality", which according to New Zealand journalist David Farrier "went bonkers on Twitter". In 2021, Richards created an updated version of the chart that went viral.

References 

American TikTokers
American women comedians
Twitter, Inc. people
1996 births
Living people
American Jews
Year of birth uncertain
Colorado College alumni
Wageningen University and Research alumni
People from Boston
21st-century American women